The National Organization of Kurdish Youth (SOZ) is a politically-independent Kurdish youth organization in Syria which was founded in October 2013. Its stated aims are to peacefully construct democracy in Syria, to defend human rights and civil society, and to achieve self-determination for the Kurdish people.

SOZ organizes peaceful demonstrations in Syria calling for an end to the Bashar al-Assad regime and the release of detainees. Members who have sought asylum in Europe organize similar protests.

Leaders include Shibal Ibrahim, Azad Atta, Abdulrahman Jawhar, Mondhir Askan, and Yousef Tamr. Ibrahim and others have been arrested, tortured and imprisoned by the Syrian government.

Background
The Kurds are Syria's largest ethnic minority, about 10 percent of the country's population. Since the start of the Syrian civil war in mid-March 2011, Syrians have called for freedom and dignity, equality and justice. Young Kurds have played a role in the peaceful revolution in Damascus and in the Kurdish areas along the northeast Syrian border with Turkey and Iraq. SOZ aims to establish better relations with Kurdish and Syrian political parties and Iraqi Kurdistan, without being affiliated with (or led by) any one party or political movement. The organization's founding was announced on 21 October 2013 at a press conference at the city of Qamishlo in Rojava (northern and northeastern Syria) by a group of young activists including Shapal Ibrahim, Azad Ata, Munzir Iskan, and Hisham Shekho.

Organizational structure

General secretariat
The general secretariat is made up of members of the central committee, fifteen members of the advisory board, and the president and deputy. It meets twice between two conferences every two years for four days, or if the central committee calls a meeting. The general secretariat can change one-third of the leadership by a of two-thirds majority, as needed. It evaluates the organization's work (including the central committee), and its decisions are binding.

Central committee
The central committee consists of two members elected from each regional commission (at least 20 percent of whom are women) in all Kurdish cities. It holds three-day meetings in January and June, and can call a meeting of the general secretariat. Decisions are made by a simple majority vote. The committee, which acts as a judiciary, evaluates the president and the leadership and may issue warnings about performance.

President and vice-president
The president and vice-president are elected at the general conference. Each three-year term may not be served more than twice in a row.

Leading commission
The 14-member leading commission (nine members from Syria and four from abroad, elected at the general conference) can speak on behalf of the organization, determine its budget, and call a meeting of the central committee. Decisions are made by a simple majority vote.

Regional committees and subcommittees
The regional (city) committee submits periodic regional-activity reports to the leadership, and elects representatives to the central committee. Each city has one 11-member regional committee except for Qamishlo, which has two committees. Each regional committee must conduct two civil activities every month: a seminar, workshop, lecture, panel discussion, or a publication (or distribution of publications). Ten-member subcommittees meet monthly or as needed.

Advisory board
The board, each member at least 42 years old, evaluates and advises the central committee and the leadership. Ten members participate in the general secretariat.

Public relations office
The public relations office has three committees:
Kurdish relations committee: Networks with Kurdish parties in Kurdistan's four regions, particularly Iraqi Kurdistan
Arab relations committee: Publishes a paper describing the Kurdish issue and SOZ policy
International relations committee: Subcommittees develop relationships with foreign countries and media outlets (including social media) to increase awareness of evolving Kurdish issues.

Finance office
The five-member finance office (two members from the leadership and three from the central committee) monitors SOZ income and expenses (particularly those of the regional committees).

Legal evaluation and studies office
The office, chaired by the vice-president and consisting of seven members from the regional committees of different cities, investigates procedural and organizational issues.

Civil office
The civil office follows up on detainee issues and provides human-rights education for agencies and groups, fosters international and regional cooperation in the field of human rights, and promulgates a culture of nonviolence and dialogue.

Regulatory office
The regulatory office oversees membership issues with three three-member committees:
 Membership committee: Reviews membership applications and maintains the organization's database
 Discipline and merit committee: Evaluates member activity
 Membership studies committee: Compiles membership statistics to increase membership

Membership
Membership is open to those between 15 and 42 years of age (except for the advisory board, which has no upper age limit) who do not belong to a political party. It may be terminated by the central committee (after referral by the leadership) for gross misconduct, including non-participation and activities which disrupt the organization's work.

See also
 Kurds in Syria

References

2013 establishments in Syria
Kurdish organisations
Organizations established in 2013